Patrick J. Stapleton (January 7, 1924 – March 13, 2001) was a Democratic member of the Pennsylvania State Senate.

Life
Stapleton, a native of Indiana, Pennsylvania, served in the U.S. Navy during World War II. He graduated from Indiana State Teachers College, now known as Indiana University of Pennsylvania, in 1949.

He was sworn in as a Pennsylvania State Senator for the 41st senatorial district on June 8, 1970. He would become known as a "fixture in the state Senate." He served as a leader in the Democratic Caucus as Policy Committee Chairman from 1983 through 1996 and as Caucus Administrator beginning in 1997.

Stapleton retired prior to the 2000 election, supporting the eventual Democratic nominee, Jim McQuown in the "wide-open race" to succeed him. However, McQuown lost to Donald C. White 54–46 in the general election. He died in 2001.

Legacy
The Patrick J. Stapleton Jr. Library at the Indiana University of Pennsylvania is named after him.

His son, Patrick, is a member of the State Liquor Control Board.

References

External links
 official PA Senate profile (archived)

1924 births
2001 deaths
Democratic Party Pennsylvania state senators
20th-century American politicians